Asva is an American, Seattle-based drone metal project, with a revolving line-up formed by G. Stuart Dahlquist (formerly of Burning Witch and Goatsnake) who is the only constant member.  Past members have included Trey Spruance, Toby Driver, Jessika Kenney, and Greg Gilmore amongst many others. The name of the project is from the Sanskrit word aśva, meaning workhorse.

Members

Current members
G. Stuart Dahlquist – bass, organ (2003–present)
Toby Driver – vocals, guitar (2010–present)
Greg Gilmore – drums (2008–present)
Jake Weller – trumpet

Past members
Andrew McInnis – organ
Dylan Carlson – guitar (2003)
Brad Mowen – vocals, drums (2003–2008)
John Schuller – guitar (2004–2007)
Trey Spurance – guitar, keyboard, samples (2004–2008)
Troy Swanson – organ (2004–2007)
Jessika Kenney – vocals (2004–2007)
Billy Anderson – vocals, guitar (2004)
Daniel La Rochelle – guitar (2005)
Milky Burgess – guitar (2007–2008)
Holly Johnson – vocals (2007) (session only)
Ben Thomas – percussion (2008) (session only)
Rick Troy – guitar (2009)
David Webb – guitar (2009)

Discography

References

Drone metal musical groups
Musical groups from Seattle